Jorge Galván (born April 1966 in Mexico City) is a Mexican writer and engineer. He is best known for his historical novel  "El Hierro y la Pólvora" (Iron and Gunpowder), for which he was awarded the First Novel UNAM – Alfaguara Prize in 2006

Galvan graduated as electronics engineer at the Universidad Autónoma Metropolitana (Mexico City), and currently lives in the City of Naucalpan (Mexico State).

Works
El Hierro y la Pólvora (Iron and Gunpowder) published in 2006 by Alfaguara.

References

External links
 PuntoDePartida.UNAM.mx (El hierro y la pólvora: historia y ficción).

Mexican male writers
Mexican engineers
1966 births
Living people
Writers from Mexico City